The 2013 Proton Malaysian Open was a professional tennis tournament played on hard courts. It was the fifth edition of the tournament, and part of the 2013 ATP World Tour. It took place in Kuala Lumpur, Malaysia between 23 and 29 September 2013.

Singles main-draw entrants

Seeds

 Rankings are as of 16 September 2013

Other entrants
The following players received wildcards into the singles main draw:
  Pablo Carreño Busta
  Chung Hyeon
  Ryan Harrison

The following players received entry from the qualifying draw:
  Somdev Devvarman
  Rajeev Ram
  Matteo Viola
  Mischa Zverev

Withdrawals
Before the tournament
  Brian Baker
  Marin Čilić (suspension)
  Juan Mónaco
  Andreas Seppi

Retirements
  Grega Žemlja (illness)

Doubles main-draw entrants

Seeds

 Rankings are as of 16 September 2013

Other entrants
The following pairs received wildcards into the doubles main draw:
  Yuki Bhambri /  Syed Mohd Agil Syed Naguib
  Pablo Carreño Busta /  Mohd Assri Merzuki

The following pairs received entry as alternates:
  Adrian Mannarino /  Michael Russell
  Rik de Voest /  Somdev Devvarman

Withdrawals
Before the tournament
  Nikolay Davydenko (wrist injury)
  Martin Emmrich (ankle injury)

Champions

Singles

  João Sousa def.  Julien Benneteau 2–6, 7–5, 6–4

Doubles

  Eric Butorac /  Raven Klaasen def.  Pablo Cuevas /  Horacio Zeballos 6–2, 6–4

External links
 Official website

Proton Malaysian Open
Proton Malaysian Open
2013 in Malaysian tennis